Victor Deniran (born 27 May 1990) is a Nigerian footballer who plays as a defender.

Career
Deniran started his career in Nigerian First Bank F.C. In winter 2008, Deniran went on a trial period with Slavia Sofia in Bulgaria and six months later signed first professional contract with the club. He was given the No.14 shirt. He made his official debut in Bulgarian first division in a match against Litex Lovech on 9 August 2008. Victor played for 90 minutes. The result of the match was a 0–3 loss for Slavia.

Personal life 
His brother Ortega Deniran plays for Edinburgh City F.C. as a forward.

External links
 Profile at pfcslavia.com

1990 births
Living people
Nigerian footballers
Association football defenders
First Bank F.C. players
PFC Slavia Sofia players
FC Sportist Svoge players
FC Botev Vratsa players
FC Montana players
FC Lyubimets players
First Professional Football League (Bulgaria) players
Nigerian expatriates in Bulgaria
Expatriate footballers in Bulgaria
Sportspeople from Lagos
21st-century Nigerian people